Namling or Namlingxoi is a town and seat of Namling County in the Tibet Autonomous Region of China, about  by road northeast of Shigatse (the second largest town in Tibet), north of Dobjoi.

Geography
The town is located at an altitude of 4683 metres (15,367 feet), at a bend in the Tsangpo River. Several forts can be seen along the hills above the river valley and one fort is the Namling Dzong. Vegetation in the area is sparse today, almost devoid of any vegetation looks like a desert country. Fossils (assessed to be of 15 million years age) unearthed here reveal that leaves, willows, alders, maples, rhododendrons and conifers existed here. The village is situated on a cone-shaped hill.

Education
Namling has developed in recent times into a regional educational centre, overlooked by the Bureau of Education. In 1993, the Namling County Schools Project received funding from the USA-based Boulder-Lhasa Sister City Project. The schools of this project achieved the best results in 1994, in Tibet.

Notable landmarks
Namling Dzong is a prominent fortress in the area, which has been likened to European castles along the Rhine. In the early 17th century, the 5th Dalai Lama founded the Ganden Chökhor monastery in Namling, reached via a chain bridge; it was the first of thirteen monasteries of his era.  There were 300 monks at the monastery in 1908. It was the seat of the Teshu Lamas.

Villages
The township contains the following villages:

Ren'ou Village 	
Xuedui Village 	
Gangba Village 	
Qiawa Village 	
Gangga Village 	
Xuemai Village 	
Gabu Village 	
Kong'a Village 	
Miru Village 	
Baimadang Village 	
Jilong Village 	
Dalong Village

References

Populated places in Shigatse
Township-level divisions of Tibet